Faeculoides leucopis is a moth of the family Erebidae first described by George Hampson in 1907. It is known from the mountains of southern India and Sri Lanka.

Adults have been found from May to June and from October to December.

The wingspan is 10–14 mm. The forewing is very broad and the reniform stigma is prominent, round and yellowish. It is brownish and the costal patch is well marked by antemedial and postmedial lines. The crosslines are well marked and the terminal line is marked by tight black interveinal spots. There is an indistinct discal spot on the hindwing.

References

Micronoctuini
Moths described in 1907